This is a list of hospitals in British Columbia sorted by the hospital name:

 
British Columbia
Hospitals